Meghauli Airport  is a domestic airport located in Meghauli, Bharatpur serving Chitwan National Park in Bagmati Province in Nepal. The airport is the older of two airports in Bharatpur, the other one being Bharatpur Airport.

History
The airfield was built in 1961, when Elizabeth II and Prince Philip visited Chitwan. In 1982, the first Elephant polo world cup was played on the airfield. After being closed for several years, the airport reopened in 2016 for charter operations and from 2017 to 2020, Nepal Airlines carried out scheduled operations again.

Facilities

Airlines and destinations

As of 2022, there are no scheduled services to and from Meghauli Airport. Previously Nepal Airlines operated routes to Kathmandu.

Incidents and accidents 
 On 25 April 1996, a Royal Nepal Airlines BAe 748 Series 2B overran the runway at Meghauli Airport, after a flight from Kathmandu, when landing in rain on the grass airstrip. The aircraft ran across some ditches, causing the nose gear to collapse. None of the four crew and 27 passengers were injured.

References

External links
 

Airports in Nepal
Chitwan District
1961 establishments in Nepal